Vastseliina Parish was a rural municipality of Estonia, in Võru County. It had a population of 2,165 (2008) and an area of 222.8 km².

Settlements
Small borough
Vastseliina

Villages
Haava - Halla - Heinasoo - Hinniala - Hinsa - Holsta - Illi - Indra - Jeedasküla - Juraski - Kaagu - Käpa - Kapera - Kerepäälse - Kirikumäe - Kõo - Kornitsa - Kõrve - Külaoru - Kündja - Lindora - Loosi - Luhte - Mäe-Kõoküla - Möldri - Mutsu - Ortuma - Paloveere - Pari - Perametsa - Plessi - Puutli - Raadi - Saarde - Savioja - Sutte - Tabina - Tallikeste - Tellaste - Tsolli - Vaarkali - Vana-Saaluse - Vana-Vastseliina - Vatsa - Viitka - Voki

Notable residents
Wrestler and Olympic gold medalist Eduard Pütsep (1898–1960) was born in Vastseliina Parish.

References

External links
 

Former municipalities of Estonia